Rebecca "Becky" Botwright, (born 22 January 1982 in Manchester), is a professional squash player from England. She reached a career-high world ranking of No. 26 in April 2006.

Becky is the younger sister of Vicky Botwright, who was also a professional squash player.

References

External links 

English female squash players
Living people
1982 births
Sportspeople from Manchester